Michurinsky is a settlement (a posyolok) in Novosibirsky District of Novosibirsk Oblast, Russia. The administrative center of Michurinsky Selsoviet. Population: 1208 (2010 Census). Michurinsky is located between Yuny Leninets and Ogurtsovo (Sovetsky District of Novosibirsk).

References

Rural localities in Novosibirsk Oblast
Novosibirsky District